Cassin's flycatcher (Muscicapa cassini), also known as Cassin's grey flycatcher or Cassin's alseonax, is a species of bird in the family Muscicapidae.  It is found in Angola, Benin, Cameroon, Central African Republic, Republic of the Congo, Democratic Republic of the Congo, Ivory Coast, Equatorial Guinea, Gabon, Ghana, Guinea, Liberia, Niger, Nigeria, Rwanda, Sierra Leone, Togo, Uganda, and Zambia.
Its natural habitat is subtropical or tropical swamps.

References

Cassin's flycatcher
Birds of Sub-Saharan Africa
Cassin's flycatcher
Taxonomy articles created by Polbot